Gnaeus Manlius Vulso (fl. 189 BC) was a Roman consul for the year 189 BC, together with Marcus Fulvius Nobilior. He led a victorious campaign against the Galatian Gauls of Asia Minor in 189 BC during the Galatian War. He was awarded a triumph in 187 BC.

Vulso belonged to the patrician gens Manlia, but his connection with the better known Torquatus branch is unknown.  He may have been descended from Aulus (or Gaius) Manlius Cn.f. Vulso, consul in 474 BC; or from Lucius Manlius A.f. Vulso Longus, consul in 256 and 250 BC.

A. Manlius Cn.f. Vulso, consul eleven years later in 178 BC, may have been his younger brother.

See also
 Manlia (gens)

Notes

Ancient Roman generals
2nd-century BC Roman consuls
Vulso, Gnaeus
Roman patricians
2nd-century BC diplomats